Sagebrush Symphony is the nineteenth album by American singer-songwriter Michael Martin Murphey, his second live album since his 1979 live/studio album Peaks, Valleys, Honkytonks and Alleys, and his first album with a symphony orchestra. Recorded live with the San Antonio Symphony Orchestra, this ambitious album, which presents cowboy songs and poems in a symphonic setting, contains a selection of Murphey's most popular songs, as well as traditional cowboy music. Murphey turns in "an impassioned performance" and the inclusion of guest artists Sons of the San Joaquin, Ric Orozco, Herb Jeffries, and Robert Mirabal "adds to the musical diversity and richness of the album."

Track listing
 "Sounds of the Range" by Michael Martin Murphey – 1:01
 "Cowboy Overture" (Cansler) by San Antonio Symphony Orchestra, Larry Cansler – 4:17
 "Cowboy Logic" (Cook, Rains) by Michael Martin Murphey – 4:43
 "The Old Chisholm Trail" by Michael Martin Murphey – 2:54
 "Down in the Valley" (Traditional) by Michael Martin Murphey – 1:49
 "Red River Valley" by Michael Martin Murphey – 3:20
 "Tumbling Tumbleweeds" (Nolan) by Michael Martin Murphey, Sons of the San Joaquin – 0:49
 "Cool Water" (Nolan) by Michael Martin Murphey, Sons of the San Joaquin – 0:57
 "Timber Trail" (Spencer) by Michael Martin Murphey, Sons of the San Joaquin – 2:22
 "Back in the Saddle Again" (Autry, Whitley) by Herb Jeffries, Michael Martin Murphey – 3:37
 "I'm a Happy Cowboy" (Jeffries) by Michael Martin Murphey, Herb Jeffries – 1:27
 "Texas to a 'T'" (Foster, Pistilli) by Herb Jeffries, Michael Martin Murphey – 2:07
 "Storm on the Prairie" (Hoffner) by Michael Martin Murphey – 0:59
 "Riders in the Sky" (Jones) by Michael Martin Murphey – 2:49
 "Wildfire" (Murphey, Cansler) by Michael Martin Murphey, Larry Cansler – 5:42
 "Wind Message" (Hoffner, Mirabal) by Michael Martin Murphey, Robert Mirabal – 5:28
 "Geronimo's Cadillac" (Murphey, Quarto) by Michael Martin Murphey – 3:15
 "Adobe Walls" (Brown, Reed) by Michael Martin Murphey – 3:35
 "The Yellow Rose of Texas" (Traditional) by Michael Martin Murphey – 1:12
 "San Antonio Rose" (Wills) by Michael Martin Murphey, Rick Orozco – 3:33
 "Happy Trails" (Evans) by Michael Martin Murphey – 4:27

Credits
Music
 Michael Martin Murphey – vocals, acoustic guitar, piano, harmonica, arranger
 Christopher Wilkins – conductor
 Larry Cansler – orchestral arrangements and composer of "Cowboy Overture"
 Bergen White – orchestral arrangements
 Jack Hannah – speaking parts
 Sons of the San Joaquin – vocals
 Rick Orozco – vocals
 Herb Jeffries – vocals
 Mark Casstevens – acoustic guitar
 Chris Leuzinger – acoustic guitar, electric guitar
 Sonny Garrish – steel guitar
 Hank Singer – fiddle, mandolin
 Robert Mirabal – flute, percussion
 David Hoffner – keyboards, orchestral arrangements
 Dennis Burnside – piano, orchestral arrangements
 Joey Miskulin – accordion
 Craig Nelson – acoustic bass
 Tommy Wells – drums
 John Wesley Ryles – background vocals
 Dennis Wilson – background vocals
 Curtis Young – background vocals

Production
 Jim Ed Norman – producer
 David Hewitt – engineer
 Tim Roberts – assistant engineer
 Sean McClintock – assistant engineer
 Robert Tassi – assistant engineer
 Phil Gitomer – assistant engineer
 Jon "JD" Dickson – digital editing
 Marc Frigo – mixing assistant
 Denny Purcell – mastering
 Danny Kee – production coordination
 Jade Novak – design
 Simon Levy – art direction
 Don Cobb – digital editing
 Eric Prestidge – digital editing, mastering, mixing, producer, engineer
 William Matthews – watercolor artwork
 Wyatt McSpadden – photography

References

External links
 Michael Martin Murphey's Official Website

Michael Martin Murphey albums
1995 live albums
Warner Records live albums
Albums produced by Jim Ed Norman